Juicy Drop is a brand of flavoured gel that is meant to be combined with gummies, taffies, and gums to enhance the flavour. It is a product of the Topps Company Inc.

Overview
Juicy Drop line of candies consist of six candy products: Juicy Drop Pop, Juicy Drop Gum, Juicy Drop Gummies, Juicy Drop Taffy, Juicy Drop Gummy Dip 'N Stix, and juicy drop re-mix. 

Juicy Drop Gum was introduced to the Juicy Drop line in 2017 with the flavours Knock-Out Punch, Blue Rebel, Apple Attack, and Watermelon Blast. One of the main goals with Juicy Drop Gum was to ensure the gum would have long-lasting flavour, which is what the accompanying sour gel booster is for.

In 2020, the Strawberry Kiwi flavour joined the Juicy Drop Gummies line of products, joining the existing Wild Cherry Berry, Knock-Out Punch, Blue Rebel, and Watermelon Blast Flavours. Like other Juicy Drop Gummies products, this new flavour comes with a sour gel applicator to enhance the flavour.

References

External links
 

Brand name confectionery
Topps confectionery products
Lollipops